Colubraria latericium is a species of sea snail, a marine gastropod mollusk in the family Colubrariidae.

Description
The length of the shell attains 60.6 mm.

Distribution
This marine species occurs off Madagascar.

References

 Bozzetti, L., 2008. Colubraria latericium (Gastropoda: Hypsogastropoda: Buccinidae: Pisaniinae) nuova specie dal Madagascar. Malacologia Mostra Mondiale 61: 17-18

External links

Colubrariidae
Gastropods described in 2008